The NHIndustries NH90 is a medium-sized, twin-engine, multi-role military helicopter. It was developed in response to NATO requirements for a battlefield helicopter which would also be capable of being operated in naval environments. The NH90 was developed and is manufactured by NHIndustries, a collaborative company owned by Airbus Helicopters, Leonardo (formerly AgustaWestland) and Fokker Aerostructures.  The first prototype conducted its maiden flight in December 1995; the type first entered operational service in 2007. As of June 2022, the NH90 has logged 327,053 flight hours in the armed forces of thirteen countries.

The NH90 is the first production helicopter to feature entirely fly-by-wire flight controls. There are two main variants, the Tactical Transport Helicopter (TTH) for army use and the navalised NATO Frigate Helicopter (NFH); each customer typically has various alterations and customisations made to their own NH90 fleets, such as different weapons, sensors, and cabin arrangements, to meet their own specific requirements.

Since its introduction into service, the NH90 has suffered several technical issues, which have delayed active deployment of the type by some operators. In 2022 Norway terminated the program and demanded a full refund, while Australia decided to retire the type 10 years ahead of schedule.

Development

Origins
In 1985, France, West Germany, Italy, the Netherlands, and the United Kingdom teamed to develop a NATO battlefield transport and anti-ship/anti-submarine helicopter for the 1990s. The United Kingdom left the team in 1987. On 1 September 1992, NH Industries signed an NH90 design-and-development contract with NAHEMA (NATO Helicopter Management Agency). This agency represented the four participating states: France, Germany, Italy, and the Netherlands. Portugal later joined the agency in June 2001. Design work on the helicopter started in 1993. The first prototype, PT1, made the type's first flight on 18 December 1995. The second prototype, PT2, first flew on 19 March 1997 and the third prototype, PT3, on 27 November 1998. On 12 December 2002, PT3 became the first helicopter to fly exclusively with fly-by-wire controls following the removal of mechanical back-up controls.

The NH90 was developed into two main variants: the Tactical Transport Helicopter (TTH) and the NATO Frigate Helicopter (NFH). These two main variants share about 75% commonality with each other. Many of the operators have requested specific configurations to their own helicopter fleets, thus each country's NH90 is effectively customized to the end-user's requirements. During the development phase of the programme in the 1990s, both technical and funding problems were experienced. In June 2000, the partner states placed a large production order, worth US$8.6 billion, for a total of 366 helicopters. Additional orders have since followed from customers in Europe, Asia, and Australia. By April 2013, a total of 529 NH90s of all variants were on order by various customers.

Production

The NH90 was initially intended to be produced at three exporting final assembly lines (FAL): Cascina Costa in Italy for AgustaWestland, Marignane in France and Donauwörth in Germany for Airbus Helicopters. The Nordic and Australian contracts stipulated production locally (the Nordic ones at Patria in Finland and the Australian ones in Brisbane). Spain has a final assembly line at Albacete. The Marignane assembly line can reportedly complete up to 22 NH90s per year.

Major components are produced by each of the shareholding companies:
Airbus Helicopters France 31.25% (Engines, rotors, electrical system, flight control, and the core avionics systems)
Airbus Helicopters Deutschland 31.25% (Forward and center fuselage, fuel system, communications, and avionics control systems)
Fokker 5.5% (Tail structure, doors, sponsons, landing gear, and the intermediate gearbox)
AgustaWestland 32% (Rear fuselage, main gearbox, hydraulic system, automatic flight control and plant management systems, power plant, and the NFH mission system)
Items built by the shareholding companies are then distributed to the six locations for assembly and flight test (Marignane, France; Tessera, Italy; Donauwörth, Germany; Halli, Finland; and Brisbane, Australia).

In late 2006, the German Army, the first customer to receive production aircraft, accepted delivery of its first NH90 TTH. In April 2010, the Royal Netherlands Navy was the first customer to receive the navalised NH90 NFH variant. In June 2014, the consortium announced that it had completed delivery of the 200th NH90; at that point, the backlog of orders was reported as reaching out to 2020. In order to alleviate delays and reduce the complexity of manufacturing a large number of NH90 variants, NH Industries proposed the adoption of a simplified baseline airframe which could be configured to the individual customer's requirements. Between 2004 and 2016, the production lead times for the NH90 had reduced from 18 months to 7.5 months.

In 2014, worldwide production of the NH90 peaked at 53 helicopters.  In October 2015, the delivery of the 250th NH90 was formally accepted by the Italian Army. In 2015, the rate of NH90 production declined, reportedly due to countries choosing to delay their orders and some contracts having been fulfilled; in 2016, the Finnish final assembly line became the first to close with its orders completed.

Concerns over performance

In 2010, German tabloid Bild reported that German Army experts had concerns that the helicopter was not yet ready for the transportation of combat troops. They stated that the seats were rated for only 110 kg (240 lb), not considered enough for a fully equipped soldier. Heavy infantry weapons could not be adequately secured and the cabin floor was prone to damage, citing an anecdote of damage caused by footwear. The helicopter could only land on firm ground, with obstacles not exceeding 16 cm (6.3 in). Troops carrying full equipment could not use the rear ramp due to weight-limitations placed on it. Adding a door machine gun was not possible due to space taken by troop ingress and egress; there was also no provision for fast roping or paratrooper equipment. In response, the German Defense Ministry proclaimed that this article referred to a prototype, not to the production model; the specifications for which were not even finalised at the time. The prototype evaluation and its results were described as a normal procedure in an ongoing design process.

In November 2011, the MRH90 program was placed on the Australian Department of Defence's "Projects of Concern" list. The most serious problem identified by a diagnostic review, which caused a brief grounding in 2010, is compressor blade rubbing caused by the bending of a spool in the Rolls-Royce Turbomeca RTM322 engine due to uneven cooling after shutdown. Other problems identified include failure of transmission oil cooler fans, windscreen cracking, an inertial navigation system that is slow to align, and the weakness of the cabin floor to withstand the impact of soldiers’ boots – a problem also encountered in German service.

In March 2014, it was announced that a Dutch NH90 had suffered higher than expected fuselage wear and corrosion following an extended deployment at sea; analysis by the Dutch National Aerospace Laboratory attributed the corrosion to design and assembly flaws. However, the aircraft were not grounded. In response, NHI Industries launched a corrosion prevention programme and enacted several design modifications. In December 2014, Dutch NH90 deliveries, which had been temporarily halted earlier in the year, restarted after the majority of identified points were addressed and an agreement was made by the manufacturer to bear the cost of developing modifications, repairs, and preventive measures against corrosion.

Costs of operation 
Ron Mark, New Zealand First Deputy Leader and Spokesperson for Defence came out in 2017 in a violent attack against the NH90, citing the statistics of 2015, "The NH90s cost $1,182 an hour to fly and that is 2.5 times more expensive than the Iroquois they replaced. They’re also unreliable, chewing through $3.3 million worth of spares in just two years."

The operating cost of a NH90 HCV (High Cabin Version) was largely reported in Swedish media during 2018 as being at least 200,000 SEK (later specified to 242,000 SEK when the McKinnley report, ordered by the Swedish defence, was published) per hour flown, or about US$28,000. In contrast, the Hkp 16, MH-60 Blackhawks in Swedish service had a cost of 40,000 SEK per hour, something that sparked a heated debate not least since it was revealed that the defence minister had demanded that the purchase had to be a joint procurement with the other Nordic countries which in turn excluded all other contenders.  A while later, a new debate among the defence bloggers begun, when it was revealed that a lot of the high costs actually was the result of the accounting practices forced upon the Swedish defence forces. The purchase cost and annual services had been factored in meaning that the cost per hour increases the less flight time per year the helicopter gets. In this debate, it was also pointed out that the Finnish defence had budgeted CPFH to €15,900 in 2017, which the year after had been lowered to €10,000.

In 2020, the Belgian ministry of defence announced a cut of 40% to the annual flight time for the NH90. The reason cited that while the old Westland Sea Kings retired in 2019 had a cost per flight hour of around €5,000. The NH-90 is more than double that at €12,000. per hour. In addition, the reliability is so low that "the services do not have enough personnel to keep them flight-worthy".

The Australian parliament released their report "MRH-90 Taipan helicopter: a quick guide" at the end of 2021, detailing the problems that has plagued the helicopter since 2005 and why they now will be replaced. There the CPFH is listed as "the helicopter’s estimated operating costs were $30,000 to $40,000 per hour, which is ‘higher than those combat aircraft with sophisticated weapons and sensor systems’ (p. 72). More recently the cost has increased to $50,000 per hour."

Axel Aloccio, head of NHI since mid-September 2022, believes that most problems stem from the teething issues of new system that always takes a few years of service to find and correct, and that most are either solved or will be addressed with the transformation plan called "New Horizon" that Aloccio' predecessor Nathalie Tarnaud Laude launched, This program  for system-wide changes, has the aim of 50-60% average global fleet availability to by the end of 2022 through better spare part availability and localisation of overhaul services. It also seek to lower the operating costs,  The time between maintenance inspections and overhaul for dynamic components have both been raised by 50% in order to keep them synchronized, from 600/1200 flight hours to 900/1800 hours respectively.

Design

The NH90 was designed to fulfill a NATO staff requirement for a multi-role, medium-sized military helicopter for both land and maritime operations. According to Flight International, the NH90 has the distinction of being the first helicopter in the world to be developed in line with NATO requirements. As such, the design of the NH90 meets with multiple national and international standards, including military airworthiness processes in Germany, France, Italy, and the Netherlands; conformance with FAR 29 and MIL-STDS design standards, as well as DEF-STN 00-970 icing conditions performance and electro-magnetic compatibility. It is produced in two principal variants, the battlefield Tactical Transport Helicopter (TTH) and the maritime NATO Frigate Helicopter (NFH).

One key innovation of the rotorcraft is the four-channel fly-by-wire control system employed; the NH90 is the first helicopter in the world to be equipped with full fly-by-wire flight controls. A four-axis autopilot is also integrated with the fly-by-wire system, as are mission and navigation systems to enable greater autonomy during operations and to reduce pilot workload. The flight envelope of the NH90 is capable of all-weather day-and-night operations, ship-borne operations during high sea states, across a temperature range from −40 °C to +50 °C, and up to a maximum altitude of 20,000 feet. Power is provided by a pair of turboshaft engines, dependent on customer selection, the NH90 is either fitted with Rolls-Royce Turbomeca RTM322 or General Electric CT7-8F powerplants; exhaust gases from the engines are filtered through an infrared suppression system for decreased sensory visibility. According to Airbus Helicopters, the NH90 possesses the lowest radar signature in its class, principally due to its diamond-shaped composite fuselage.

The NH90 features an advanced composite airframe, designed for ballistic tolerance, a high level of crashworthiness, lower weight, and 30 per cent greater endurance than a metallic counterpart. The four main rotor blades are also composed of composite materials, increasing fatigue strength and lifespan while providing for greater damage tolerance. The unobstructed main cabin area is entered either by large sliding doors on either side of the fuselage or via a rear ramp, the cabin is designed to accommodate modular equipment packages to enable the rotorcraft to be rapidly reconfigured, providing for operational flexibility. In a troop-transport capacity, the cabin can accommodate up to 20 fully equipped soldiers, or up to 12 stretchers in a medical evacuation role, some light vehicles may also be transported; the main cabin is equipped with environmental control systems and sound proofing measures to improve passenger conditions.

The NH90 can be equipped with various mission-specific systems, including modular armor plating around the cabin area for undertaking high-risk missions and an ice protection system for operations within cold climates. It can also make use of the In-Hover Flight Refuelling System (HIFR) as well as additional internal and external fuel tanks to conduct extended range missions. Other equipment includes a wire strike protection system, rappelling system, hoist, cargo hook, search light and various seating options, including crashworthy foldable seats. For performing maritime operations, such tasked NH90s are typically equipped with the Harpoon deck-locking system, automatic main rotor blade and tail folding mechanisms, and other deck handling systems to conduct all-weather ship-borne operations; it is also typically outfitted with dipping sonar and sonobuoy processing equipment.

The NH90 features a range of customizable avionics systems, dependent on customer selection and purpose. On some models, French firm Thales Group provides various parts of the avionics, such as the glass cockpit, full-colour multifunction displays, tactical mission and encrypted communication systems, the TopOwl helmet-mounted sight/display, IFF and autonomous navigation systems, and the electrical power generation system. Other systems include a forward looking infrared (FLIR), weather radar, digital map generation system, enhanced ground proximity warning system, personal locator system, and VHF/UHF/HF tactical radios. In 2015, the NH90 became the first helicopter to receive a laser-based airborne collision avoidance system. Onboard mission systems feature a dual-redundant databus, are compliant with MIL-STD 1553, and are comprehensively managed via sensor fusion functionality. Customer demand for future avionics improvements such as new data links and communication systems, as well as additional electro-optical sensors, have been anticipated by the manufacturer.

The helicopter is equipped with emergency floats which deploy in case of a water landing and are designed to buy the crew enough time to exit the helicopter before it sinks.

Operational history

Australia

In 2005, Australia ordered 12 aircraft to replace its aging fleet of Army UH-1 Iroquois helicopters. In June 2006, the Australian Defence Force announced plans to replace its UH-60 Black Hawk and Westland Sea King helicopters; a further 34 NH90s were ordered, for an ordered total of 46; four being manufactured in Europe, and 42 being manufactured locally by Australian Aerospace (an Airbus Helicopters subsidiary) in Brisbane. The type is designated MRH-90 Taipan, 'MRH' stands for Multi Role Helicopter. Six examples are operated by 808 Squadron of the Royal Australian Navy, which was reformed in 2011 and recommissioned in 2013. The other 40 are operated by the Australian Army.

On 20 April 2010, an ADF MRH90 suffered a single engine failure near Adelaide, landing safely at RAAF Base Edinburgh. NHI Industries sent personnel to Australia to investigate the failure. On 18 May the ADF announced that the MRH90 fleet was grounded due to engine issues since the April incident. The cause of the failure was determined as the compressor blade contacting the engine casing, leading to new preventative inspections; flights resumed in July 2010. In June 2011, the NFH variant lost to the Sikorsky MH-60R in competition to replace the Royal Australian Navy S-70B Sea Hawks.

In July 2014, the Australian National Audit Office released a report on the MRH90, citing a series of procurement errors and development deficiencies delaying final operational capability (FOC), originally planned for that month, until April 2019, nearly five years later than planned.  Some nine years after the initial contract was signed, the models first delivered in 2007 had not validated any of the 11 set operational capability milestones, and forced redesigns including bolstered cabin floors and windscreens, rappelling hooks, and door gunner positions; obtaining spare parts and sustaining the helicopters has also been more costly. The Australian Army will be forced to operate its aging S-70A Black Hawk beyond their planned retirement date. Due to the delays, Australia will receive an additional helicopter, for a total of 47. By September 2015, most of the MRH90's flaws had reportedly been addressed. In June 2017, the Australian Navy successfully completed trials aboard , marking a major milestone in the helicopter programme.

In 2015, the Australian Army decided to delay retiring 20 Black Hawks by 4 years until the end of 2021 in order to develop a special operations capable MRH90. This required developing a Fast Roping and Rappelling Extraction System (FRRES) and a gun mount for the cabin door. The Taipan Gun Mount can fit either a M134D minigun or MAG 58 machine gun and when not in use can be moved into a outward stowed position to provide clearance to enable fast roping and rappelling. In February 2019, the first two of 12 MRH90 helicopters were delivered to the 6th Aviation Regiment. On 24 June 2021, all Australian NH-90s were temporarily grounded due to lack of maintenance and spare parts which have to be shipped from Europe to Australia. In December 2021, on the same day the Black Hawk fleet was retired, the Australian government announced that it would replace the Army's fleet of MRH90s  with new UH-60M Black Hawks. In May 2022, the government announced that it would replace the Navy's fleet of MRH90s with MH-60R Seahawks.

Belgium
In 2007, Belgium signed on for a firm order of 8 aircraft (4 TTH, 4 NFH) and an option for 2 additional TTH. In September 2012, NHI performed the first flight of the Belgium's Tactical Transport Helicopter (TTH), which is broadly similar to the French NH90 “Caiman” version. In January 2013, eight NH90s were on firm order. On 1 August 2013, Belgium received its first NH90 NFH at Full Operational Capability (FOC). On 23 October 2013, Belgium's first NH90 TTH entered service, the last was delivered on 13 November 2014. From first delivery until the last, three NH90s flew 34 hours a month for a total of 450 flight hours with a 67 percent availability rate, making Belgium one of the type's most intensive users. Two NH90 NFHs for the navy were delivered, the final two were delivered by early 2015 to replace their Westland Sea King helicopters for Search and Rescue operations.

On 21 August 2015, the Belgian Navy declared its NH90s had attained initial operational readiness; on 28 August 2015, the first rescue mission performed by a Belgian Navy NH90 took place.

In June 2020, The Strategic Defence Review (STAR) of Belgium planned to phase out the 4 TTH helicopters by 2024 due to their high operating costs and low availability. They are planned to be replaced, along with the last Agusta 109, by 15 Airbus H145M helicopters. The 4 NFH variants are to remain operational and be provided with currently lacking sensors and weapons for anti-submarine warfare.

Finland

In October 2001, Finland signed a contract for 20 NH90 TTHs for the Finnish Army to replace its ageing fleet of Mil Mi-8 helicopters. In March 2008, NH Industries began NH90 deliveries to Finland; deliveries had been delayed from an initial 2004 date, to minimize further delay, aircraft were first delivered to an Initial Operational Configuration (IOC-) and Nearly Operational Configuration (IOC+), to be later modified by Patria into a Final Operational Configuration (FOC). In September 2011, the Finnish Defence Forces and Patria signed an agreement to provide ballistic protection for onboard personnel across the NH90 fleet.

In June 2011, nine Finnish NH90s participated in the Finnish Defense Forces' main field exercise, transporting 157 soldiers across 320 kilometers in two rotations; their performance was described as having exceeded expectations. In January 2015, it was reported that Finnish NH90s had been experiencing considerable reliability issues, at one time in 2014 fleet availability dipped to 19%, and some spare parts had up to seven months waiting time. By early 2015, the combined NH90s fleet had accumulated a total of 7,000 flight hours, and had an availability rate of 40%. On 18 June 2015, delivery of the final Finnish NH90 took place. In November 2015, the availability rate was reported as having surpassed 50 percent. All helicopters were in Final Operational Configuration (FOC) in 2018, 17 years after order.

France

The French government had initially ordered a total of 34 NH90 TTHs for the French Army Light Aviation and 27 NFH for the Navy. Both versions will be named "Caïman" and final assembly will be carried out by Airbus Helicopters. The French Army had intended to buy 68 NH90; however, the April 2013 defence review could have cancelled the contract for the second batch of 34. Under the "Bonn rebate" deal, France receives a 12% discount on its 68 Army helicopters; a November 2012 Senate report put the French TTH per unit price at €28.6M after discount, set on the assumption of total orders of 605 aircraft by 2020. Cuts to France's order would result in workshare reallocation; possibly including French Navy NFH90s being assembled in Italy and Fokker performing maintenance of French TTHs. On 29 May 2013, France formally ordered the second batch of 34 NH90 TTHs for just under €1 billion. In January 2016, France placed an order for six additional NH90 TTHs.

The French Army took delivery of its first NH90 TTH in December 2011.  On 21 December 2012, the French Navy received its first NH90 NFH in final operating capability. In December 2010, the NH90 formally achieved in-service status with the French Navy, being initially used to perform search and rescue and maritime counter-terrorism operations. The first seven aircraft were delivered to an interim "Step A" configuration; following aircraft were delivered to the "Step B" standard and are forecast to be delivered at a rate of two per year until 2020. For the ASW role in French service the helicopter is equipped with dipping sonar, acoustic buoys and MU90 torpedoes. The French Navy formally cleared the type to perform anti-surface warfare duties in 2012, clearance to perform anti-submarine warfare missions followed in 2013, allowing the NH90 to take over the missions previously performed by the Navy's Westland Lynx and Aérospatiale Super Frelon helicopter fleets. On 3 November 2014, the French Army Light Aviation deployed two of its NH90s to Mali; both helicopters had been fitted with three additional fuel tanks to fly the four-day ferry flight to the region.

In October 2020, France signed a contract to develop the TFRA Standard 2 configuration for French Army special forces using the final batch of 10 NH90 TTH already ordered. A design study for the new configuration began 18 months earlier in cooperation with Belgium and Australia. The first phase of the design will feature a Safran EuroFLIR 410 electro-optical system (EOS), external  fuel tanks and a digital 3D map. The cabin will feature a central rappelling and extraction device, gun mounts for M3M .50 caliber machine guns and fold-able step. The rear ramp will feature a quick removable leaf doors system, fast-rope beam, fold-able step and various improvements made to enable the door to be used inflight. The developmental Safran Eurofl'Eye distributed aperture system (DAS) and digital Thales TopOwl helmet-mounted display may be integrated in a second phase with electrical and mechanical provisions made for their installation. The first five are to be delivered in 2025 and the last five in 2026 to the 4th Special Forces Helicopter Regiment.

Germany

The German Army chose to procure the troop transport variant.  The first three serial production NH90s were delivered to the German Army in December 2006.  By January 2013, a total of 80 aircraft were on order for the army.  In 2009, the German Navy was also considering the procurement of up to 30 NFH for its new Maritime Helicopter.  In March 2013, the German government chose to reorganise the NH90 procurement; the Army's fleet of 122 NH90s was reduced to 82; 18 NH90s previously ordered for the German Army were converted to the NFH maritime variant for the navy instead. On 26 June 2013, the German defense committee declared that the order for a combined 202 NH90 and Tiger helicopters was to be reduced to 157. In December 2014, Germany announced that, in addition to the 80 troop transports firmly on order, it was considering an option for an additional 22 NH90s; it was investigating the possibility of setting up a multinational helicopter unit to operate these 22 helicopters as a shared NATO resource with other countries using and contributing to the force.

In July 2012, the German NH90 fleet reached a combined total of 5,000 flight hours. In April 2013, up to 4 German Army NH90 TTH were deployed in Afghanistan in a Forward Air Medical Evacuation role in support of coalition forces operating in the country. On 23 June 2013, German Army NH90s were declared operationally capable of medical evacuation operations. Following an engine failure and controlled crash in Uzbekistan in July 2014, the German Army temporarily grounded the type for investigation. In December 2015, it was announced that production of the German Navy's variant of the NH90 NFH, named Sea Lion, had formally commenced; a refit of the German Army's TTH variant was also underway at the same time. Since late 2014, Germany has promoted the establishment of a multinational NH90 force for combat MEDEVAC missions; the taskforce would comprise up to 20 NH90s.

The Navy's version, known as the NH90 Sea Lion, is based on the NH90 NFH. The Sea Lion first flew on 8 December 2016. Its 18 NH90 Sea Lions are equipped with improved navigation and communications equipment permitting operation within civil airspace, along with additional sensors for military missions. The IFF system was also updated.  Designed to replace Germany's Westland Sea Kings in the SAR and Vertrep roles, the Sea Lion was to enter service with the German Navy by the second quarter of 2019. On 26 November 2019, the German Navy stated that the NH90 is not going operational at this time due to deficiencies in technical documentation not allowing safe operations.

On 20 November 2020 the Bundestag approved the purchase of 31 more helicopters. These will be used by the navy to replace their 22 Sea Lynx Mk88A helicopters. The deal is valued at €2.7 billion including spares, accessories and training material.

Greece
In August 2003, Greece ordered 20 NH90s with an option for 14 more.  In early 2013, the German newspaper Bild alleged that Airbus officials paid €41 million in bribes to Greek officials to secure the order; Airbus stated that the claim was "groundless".  On December 12 it was stated that deliveries would start again after an embargo by the Hellenic Government, with 4 helicopters being of the SPECOPS specification.

By early 2017, 12 NH90s had been delivered and are in service, with eight aircraft to be delivered from the manufacturer.

Italy

In June 2000, Italy signed an initial contract for a batch of 60 TTH (Tactical Transport Helicopter) for the Italian Army, along with a further 46 NFH (NATO Frigate Helicopter) and 10 TTH for the Italian Navy. On 30 December 2007, the first NH90 TTH was formally handed over to the Italian Army. On 23 June 2011, the navy received its first NH90, which was delivered to an interim MOC (Meaningful Operational Capability) standard, capable of performing training, search and rescue, and utility operations; anti-submarine and anti-surface warfare capabilities were not initially available until aircraft are retrofitted to a FOC (Final Operational Capability) standard. In May 2013, the Italian Army took delivery of the first NH90 TTH of a FOC standard; in November 2013, the Italian Navy took delivery of its first FOC-standard NH90 NFH.

In 2012, Italy deployed a total of 5 Army NH90 TTHs to support troops participating in the International Security Assistance Force in Afghanistan. The NH90s, which were air-transported individually by allied Boeing C-17 Globemaster III cargo aircraft, replaced six Agusta/Bell 205s in performing tactical transport and medevac operations; Army Aviation Commander Gen. Enzo Stefanini stated that "…in Afghan conditions, the NH90 is delivering performance 15 percent above what was envisaged".

Netherlands
The Netherlands, one of the original supporters of the programme, ordered a total of 20 units, comprising 12 NFH and 8 TNFH for the Royal Netherlands Navy, In 2010, the Royal Netherlands Navy became the first customer to receive the NFH variant.

In 2009, concerns surfaced that design changes had made the helicopter too heavy to operate from Dutch frigates for which they were ordered. In June 2014, the Dutch government decided not to accept the last batch of 7 NH90s due to some 100 shortcomings found in relation to the design, manufacturing and material choice of the aircraft, in particular corrosion in the presence of salt water. In December 2014, NH90 deliveries restarted after the Dutch government came to an agreement with the manufacturer, under which modifications and necessary repairs against corrosion would be made at the manufacturer's cost; 75 of the 100 shortcomings were also reported as having been solved.

In April 2013, the navy deployed the type onboard  to fight piracy in the Gulf of Aden. In November 2014, the Royal Netherlands Navy deployed a single NH90NFH to Somalia to support Operation Atalanta in Somalia.

On 19 July 2020, a Royal Netherlands Navy NH90 helicopter crashed off the coast of Aruba, killing two crew members and injuring two passengers. The Dutch Ministry of Defence launched an investigation, temporarily grounding all of the country's NH90s.

New Zealand
In July 2006, the New Zealand government signed a NZ$771 million (~€500M) contract to purchase eight NH90s (plus one extra for spares) to replace the Royal New Zealand Air Force's (RNZAF) fleet of 13 UH-1 Iroquois helicopters. For ease of manufacture and logistics, New Zealand deliberately chose its NH90 configuration to be nearly identical to the larger Australian fleet. On 7 December 2011, deliveries to New Zealand formally began with the first two NH90s being airlifted by a leased Antonov An-124 cargo aircraft to RNZAF Base Ohakea. In February 2013, the first phase of the RNZAF's operational evaluation of the NH90 was completed, clearing the type to begin operational duties.

Between September 2013 and July 2014, the first four delivered NH90s were retrofitted to a final operational configuration; later aircraft were already delivered to this standard. On 31 October 2014, the RNZAF announced that they had received into service the last of the eight NH90 TTHs. Following command structure changes in December 2014, the NH90 fleet was tasked with additional responsibilities, including casualty evacuation during search and rescue operations and providing transport services to the New Zealand Police and other government personnel. In April 2015, Defence Minister Gerry Brownlee questioned the inability of the NH90 fleet to contribute to relief efforts in the aftermath of Cyclone Pam, revealing that the fleet may be refitted with an automated blade and tail folding system to better enable ship borne deployments in the future.

In April 2016, NH90s flew 160 hours during relief missions in Fiji following the devastation of Cyclone Winston.

After the Kaikoura earthquakes in November 2016, the NH90s were critical in delivering aid and supplies to the area. They also assisted with civilian evacuations of foreign nationals.

In April 2017, the RNZAF's NH90 fleet was grounded following an in-flight single engine failure which forced an emergency landing.

In November 2021, New Zealand NH90, NZ3302, became the first of its type to reach 2,000 flying hours. According to the RNZAF, despite being delivered years after other customers, high serviceability rates allow New Zealand NH90s to fly more hours per aircraft than other operators.

Norway
In 2001, Norway ordered 14 NH90 helicopters for use by the Royal Norwegian Navy and Norwegian Coast Guard, to be delivered in 2005-2008. In December 2011, the first helicopter was delivered. In July 2012, the Norwegian Deputy Defence Minister Roger Ingebrigtsen announced that "once our current Westland Lynx helicopters reach their end of life in 2014, we are going to have replacement helicopters on our naval vessels. If the NH90 hasn’t been delivered, we will purchase another helicopter... considering that the aircraft were to be delivered by 2005, and that delivery is yet to start by 2012, our confidence in the producer isn't exactly on the rise" In August 2012 it was reported that the Royal Norwegian Air Force would be recommending that the Ministry of Defence contact Sikorsky to verify whether versions of the H-60 Seahawk, specifically the MH-60R, would be a viable alternative to the NH-90 in the anti-submarine warfare (ASW) role. Defence Minister Espen Barth Eide stated "We still believe the marine version of the NH90 to be the optimal platform, and we hope to purchase it, but there are limits to our patience."  In January 2016, six of the 14 aircraft had been delivered.

A February 2018 report by the Norwegian Armed Forces found that its fleet of NH90 helicopters offer insufficient flight hours for the intended roles. The report advised that all helicopters are converted to the anti-submarine warfare role as required by the Royal Norwegian Navy, as opposed to current plans which see 6 of the 14 helicopters in that role, and the rest configured for Norwegian Coast Guard duties. The Norwegian Ministry of Defence stated that it would consider the report's recommendations before making a decision on the matter.

In September 2018, the Norwegian Armed Forces reversed course and released an updated study that affirms that under "certain conditions" the requirements for both the navy and coast guard can be met with the current order of 14 helicopters. The conditions specifically state good spare parts availability, sufficient aircraft for maintenance scheduling and a sufficient overhaul capacity. Norwegian Minister of Defence Frank Bakke-Jensen added that although the inauguration is challenging, the ministry holds on to the timeline in which phasing in will be completed by 2022. In February 2022 the Norwegian Minister of Defense again threatened to terminate the NH90 contract due to great concerns regarding new delays and NHI not meeting contractual obligations, considering sourcing alternative helicopters.

In June 2022 the Norwegian Minister of Defense announced the Norwegian Defence Material Agency was given the task to terminate the NH90 contract due to NHI not meeting contractual obligations, and announced that the NH90 is taken out of operation with immediate effect.

Oman
In July 2004, the Sultanate of Oman issued an order for a total of 20 NH90 TTHs for the Royal Air Force of Oman (RAFO). To cope with the extreme flight conditions of the Middle East, RAFO NH90s are equipped with enhanced power plants; the type is to replace the Agusta/Bell 205A and Agusta/Bell 212 used for tactical transport and search and rescue operations. On 23 June 2010, the first two NH90 TTHs were delivered to the RAFO at Musana Air Base. By July 2012, ten NH90s had been delivered to the RAFO; in Omani service, the NH90 has established an endurance record, flying  without refueling during a 5-hour 21 minute-long mission.

Qatar
In 2014, Qatar announced that it would invest in NH90 helicopters for $2.76 billion. An contract is expected to be signed in March 2018, during the Dimdex defence exhibition. The signing happened on 14 March 2018, which finalised the purchase of 28 NH90 Helicopters in a deal that is worth 3 billion euros. The agreement includes 16 NH90s for tactical transport and 12 NH90s for naval purposes. The deal is supposed to help Qatar with modernizing her military helicopter fleet. On 20 August 2018, Leonardo announced the contract with Qatar was made effective for a total sum of US$3.7 billion, covering the agreed upon number of helicopters, with an option with six more of each type.

On December 23, 2020, the first flights for Qatari-bound NH90s were being conducted for general evaluation.

Spain
On 20 May 2005 the Council of Ministers authorised the acquisition of 45 NH90 TTHs; in December 2006, it was announced that a procurement contract for the Spanish Armed Forces had been signed. The Spanish NH90 variant features domestically assembled General Electric CT7 8F5 engines, customised communications suite, and Indra-developed electronic warning systems. The original budget for the procurement was for €1,260 million; by 2010, this had grown to €2,463M. In June 2012, it was announced that Spain was negotiating to cut its purchase to 37 aircraft. On 18 December 2014, Spain took delivery of the first NH90 TTH, which had been assembled at Airbus Helicopters Albacete facility; by this point, the order had been reduced to a total of 22 NH90s of the TTH variant.

In January 2018, NHIndustries president Vincent Dubrule stated he was confident Spain would place a follow-on order by the end of 2018 for an additional 23 TTH NH90, bringing the total back up to 45. In September 2018, the Spanish government agreed to the purchase of the additional 23 TTH NH90 helicopters, including seven for naval purposes.

Sweden

In 2001, Sweden signed a contract for 18 NH90 TTH, made up of 13 TTT/SAR and 5 SAR/ASW to be operated by the Swedish Air Force. Because of renewed foreign submarine activity at the Swedish coast in 2014 it was decided in 2015 that four TTT/SAR would be modified to SAR/ASW in order to increase the anti-submarine warfare capability, so there will be 9 TTT/SAR and 9 SAR/ASW. The NH90 is known as the Helikopter 14 (HKP14) in Swedish service, the FOC version of TTT/SAR are designated HKP14E and the FOC version of SAR/ASW are designated HKP14F.

By November 2015, Sweden had ordered 18 NH90s with ten helicopters delivered.  Sweden did not expect its NH90s to be operational until 2020 and ordered 15 UH-60M Black Hawks in 2011, deploying four of its new Black Hawks to Afghanistan in March 2013. In December 2015, the first Swedish NH90 in a full ASW configuration was delivered. Sweden announced on 1 November 2022 that its NH90s will be replaced with S-70 (H-60) variants and an undetermined aircraft.

Cancelled orders and failed order campaigns
Portugal
Portugal was the fifth state to join the programme with an order for ten transport NH90 in June 2001; it was intended for these to equip the Portuguese Army Light Aviation Unit. However, in July 2012, fiscal consequences of the Great Recession led Portugal to cancel the order, despite having already spent €87m on the project, in order to save another €420m in acquisition and running costs to 2020.

Saudi Arabia
In July 2006, the Saudi Government agreed to purchase 64 NH90s. Then in October 2007 the government changed its plans, and agreed to buy 150 Russian-made Mi-35 and Mi-17 helicopters instead.

Egypt
In July 2015, the Egyptian Navy entered negotiations for the purchase of 5 NH90 NFH helicopters; these were intended to serve on board its newly acquired FREMM frigate Tahya Misr and 4 Gowind corvettes that were also on order. The NH90 helicopters would all be of French standard. In October 2015, it was reported that negotiations for a "large quantity" of NH90s had reached an advanced stage. In April 2019 it was announced that Egypt was ordering the AW149 and not the NH90.

Variants

NFH: NATO Frigate Helicopter

The primary role of the NFH version is autonomous ASW and anti-surface unit warfare (ASuW), mainly from naval ships. These aircraft are equipped for day and night, adverse weather and severe ship motion operations.  Additional roles include anti-air warfare support, vertical replenishment (VERTREP), SAR and troop transport. France are splitting their purchase between the "NFH version combat" costing €43.3m in FY2013 and the "NFH version soutien" (support) at €36.4m in FY2013.

SH-90A
Italian Navy designation from 2012 for NH90 NFH.
NH90 NFH Caïman
French Navy designation for NH90 NFH.
NH90 Sea Lion
German Navy development of the French NH90 NFH.  The Sea Lion features a reduced set of sensors as the main task is SAR and ship based Transport (VERTREP and Special Forces) and is usually unarmed (doorguns can be installed). First flight was on 8 December 2016 and service deliveries started in October 2019.
NH90 Sea Tiger
Another German Navy development of the NFH90. The Sea Tiger will be the future helicopter for anti-submarine warfare (ASW) and anti-surface unit warfare. The first helicopters were ordered in 2019 with a potential total of up to 31.

TTH: Tactical Transport Helicopter

The primary role of the TTH version is the transport of 20 troops or more than 2,500 kg of cargo, heliborne operations and search & rescue. It can quickly be adapted to MEDEVAC/CASEVAC missions by fitting up to 12 stretchers or cargo delivery capability.  Additional roles include special operations, electronic warfare, airborne command post, parachuting, VIP transport and flight training.

Helikopter 14 (Hkp 14)
The fleet consists of nine ground operative helicopters, Hkp 14E, and nine helicopters for maritime use equipped with sonar and search radar for submarine hunting with the designation Hkp 14F. The Swedish aircraft have a Tactical Mission System developed by SAAB Finnish and Swedish TTHs are called Tactical Troop Transports (TTT) in some contexts.
HT-29 Caimán
Spanish Army designation for NH90 GSPA TTH.
MRH-90 Taipan
Australian Defence Force designation for NH90 TTH.
NH90 TTH Caïman
French Army designation for NH90 TTH.
UH-90A
Italian Army designation for the NH90 TTH.
MH-90A
Italian Navy variant of the NH90 TTH.

MTT: Maritime Tactical Transport
The MTT is a blend between the TTH and NFH, combining the land-based configuration of the TTH with specialized maritime features of the NFH, including folding rotorblades, a tail-boom, and a strengthened undercarriage. The variant was first announced in February 2019 and has reportedly piqued interest from the Spanish and Italian armed forces who may order this variant as part of existing orders.

Operators

Australian Army; Will be phased out in 2025
Royal Australian Navy; Will be phased out in 2025

 Belgian Air Component; 4 TTH's flown for Belgian Army will be phased out in 2025

Finnish Army

French Army
French Navy

German Army
German Navy

 Hellenic Army

 Italian Army
 Italian Navy

 Royal Netherlands Navy

 Royal New Zealand Air Force

 Royal Air Force of Oman

 Qatar Emiri Air Force

Spanish Army
Spanish Air and Space Force

 Defence Force Helicopter Wing; 18 NH90 HCV (High Cabin Version)

Former operators

 Royal Norwegian Air Force; The Ministry of Defense announced its NH90s are phased out from service as of June 2022.

Specifications (NH90)

See also

References

Footnotes

Citations

External links

  NHIndustries
 NH90, Leonardo company
 NH90, Airbus
 NH90, Royal New Zealand Air Force
 "NH90: Europe’s Medium Helicopter Contender".  Defense industry daily
 "Eurocopter rejects criticism of NH90 helicopter by ‘secret report’".  Defpro
  MH90-NG, German NH90 NFH variant

NH90
1990s international military utility aircraft
1990s international anti-submarine aircraft
1990s international helicopters
Twin-turbine helicopters
Military helicopters
Articles containing video clips
Aircraft first flown in 1995
Anti-submarine helicopters